DIPS may refer to:
Defense independent pitching statistics (baseball)
Dip (exercise)
Division of International Protection Services, under the United Nations High Commissioner for Refugees
Washington Diplomats, a defunct professional soccer team
 Nickname of Bollywood actress, Deepika Padukone
DIPS (Digital Image Processing with Sound)
Dips (TV series), Swedish comedy series

See also
DIP (disambiguation)